Reineh is an Arab town in northern Israel. Located in the Galilee, between Nazareth and Qana of Galilee, it attained local council status in 1968.

History
Archaeological remains dating from the Middle Bronze Age, Persian period (fifth–fourth centuries BCE), Hellenistic (second century BCE), Early and Middle Roman period (first century BCE and second century CE) Byzantine, early Islamic period, Crusader and Mamluk have been found here. Pottery imported from Syria and Italy in the 14th–16th century CE found here, indicate that the village had a strong economy in the Mamluk period.

Ottoman period

In 1517, the village was included in the Ottoman empire with the rest of Palestine, and in the 1596 tax-records it appeared as Rayna, located in the Nahiya of Tabariyya of the Liwa Safad. The taxable population was 151; 139 families and 6 bachelors; all Muslim, in addition to 6 Christian families. They paid taxes for various agricultural products; 5200 akçe on wheat, 2100 on barley, 350 on fruit trees, 200 on vegetable and fruit gardens, 250 on goats and beehives, in addition to 900 for occasional revenues and 480 for Jizya. Archaeological remains from the early Ottoman era have also been found here.
A map from Napoleon's invasion of 1799 by Pierre Jacotin showed the place, named as El Raineh. In 1806, Seetzen noted a spring in the village (which he called Reni), whose inhabitant were half Muslim, half "Greek Christians".

In 1837, Reineh was badly damaged in the Galilee earthquake. William McClure Thomson travelled in the region three weeks afterwards, and described how Reineh, (which he called Rumaish), was mostly destroyed, with thirty deaths occurring as people were crushed in their homes. Many more would have suffered the same had they not been at evening prayers at the church there, which was a small building that was not seriously damaged. A total of 200 people were killed in Reineh.

In 1838; the population of Reineh was described as being Greek Orthodox Christians and Sunni Muslim, and in 1852 a "Greek" church was noted in Reineh.

In 1875 Victor Guérin noted: "On 22 June, after a day resting up at Nazareth, I set out on my march again at 5 am, heading northeast, then north northeast. At 5.33 am, I passed by a copious spring, called A'in er Reineh. Next to the small pool that catches its flow, an ancient sarcophagus has been placed, in the form of a trough, the external parts of which tank are elegantly sculptured with whorls and garlands. This spring waters gardens planted with fig and pomegranate trees. The village of Reineh stretches over the southern slopes of the hill it abuts. It contains approximately 800 residents, half of them Muslims and the other half schismatic Greeks, with some Protestants as well. The reason for the latter is that an English mission has been active here for some years and established a local school."

In 1881, the PEF's Survey of Western Palestine (SWP) described it: "A large village of well-built houses, containing about 500 Christians and Moslems. There are two springs south of the village; one, called 'Ain Kana. It is surrounded by arable ground and olive-groves. There is a church in the village."

A population list from about 1887 showed that Reineh had about 1150 inhabitants; half Muslims and half Christians.

British Mandatory period

In the Mandatory Palestine, at the 1922 census of Palestine, Reineh had a population of 787; 423 Christians and 364 Muslims. Among the Christians, 203 were Greek Orthodox, 87 Roman Catholics, 101 Greek Catholic (Melkites) and 32 Church of England. The population increased in the 1931 census to 1,015 residents living in 243 houses. The religious breakdown of the population was 389 Christians, 1 Jew and 625 Muslims.

The 1927 earthquake hit Reineh  worse than the other villages in the area, and afterwards the Christians started rebuilding in the area called "New Reineh".

In the 1945 statistics Reineh (Er Reina) had a population of 1,290; 500 Christians and 790 Muslims. The total land area was 16,029 dunams; 15,899 owned by Arabs and the rest, 130 dunams, were public land. Of this, 915 were allocated for plantations and irrigable land, 10,451 for cereals, 10 for citrus and bananas, while 139 dunams were classified as built-up (urban) areas.

1948–1949

Reineh was conquered by Israeli forces in July 1948, during Operation Dekel. In September, 14 Arab residents were reportedly murdered by Israeli authorities after they had been detained near the village, brought into Reineh and accused of smuggling. The victims included a young Bedouin woman, and Yusuf al-Turki, a member of the "Land of Israel Workers Alliance".

In December 1948/January 1949 it was proposed that Saffuriya's remaining inhabitants be moved to Reineh, as their "neighbouring [Jewish] settlements coveted Saffuriya lands". When the Saffuriya inhabitants were expelled by the Israelis in January 1949, 14 were expelled to Lebanon, while the rest went to Nazareth, 'Illut, Kafr Kanna and Reineh.

Cana
In 1878 Claude Reignier Conder suggested that the small spring south of Reineh, named "Ain Kana", was the location of biblical Cana.

See also
People from Reineh
Arab localities in Israel

References

Bibliography

  (p. 683)

 (p. 277)
    (p. 132)

 (p. 439)

External links
Information on Reina on Palestinian web site
Survey of Western Palestine, Map 6:  IAA, Wikimedia commons

Arab localities in Israel
Arab Christian communities in Israel
Local councils in Northern District (Israel)